Murderland is a three-part British television series created by David Pirie and directed by Catherine Morshead. The series also marks a return to ITV for Robbie Coltrane. The series was filmed in June 2009 and the first episode was transmitted on Monday, 19 October 2009.

Plot summary
Murderland tells of the mystery surrounding a traumatic murder, as seen from the perspective of the three primary characters. Carrie, the daughter of the murdered woman, Douglas Hain, the detective in charge of the investigation, and Sally, the murder victim, all have their story to tell. Haunted by her mother's murder when she was a child, Carrie seeks to uncover the truth so that she can move on with her life. As the investigation unfolds, Carrie's yearning to discover who murdered her mother grows more intense, bringing her closer to the detective working the case.

Cast

DI Douglas Hain - Robbie Coltrane
Carrie - Bel Powley
Carol - Amanda Hale
Sally - Lucy Cohu
Dr. Laura Maitland - Sharon Small
Oliver - Nicolas Gleaves
Whitaker - Andrew Tiernan
Crawford - Guy Henry
Tony Philips - David Westhead

Episodes

Home media
The complete series of Murderland was released on DVD on 1 February 2010.

References

External links
 

2009 British television series debuts
2009 British television series endings
2000s British drama television series
2000s British crime television series
English-language television shows
Films directed by Catherine Morshead
ITV mystery shows
Television series by Banijay